Hubballi is a 2006 Kannada-language action thriller film directed by Om Prakash Rao starring Sudeep and Rakshita. Released on 10 November 2006, it features a background score and soundtrack composed by A. R. Hemanth and lyrics by Da Ra Bendre, K. Kalyan and Padma Hemanth. Sai Entertainment dubbed the film into Hindi as Vardee Tujhe Salaam in 2008. The film was a box office success.

Plot 
Major Chandrakanth (Ananthavelu) found a man lying by the road when jogging and admitted him to the hospital. It is Sudeep. Sudeep recovers from his injuries. He starts to find about himself with the help of Major's daughter Priya (Rakshitha). A stranger noticed him and shouted, "Are you still alive?" Sudeep chased him to find out, but escapes to Basappa Ullagaddi (Swasthik Shankar) and tells him about it.

Police arrest Sudeep and Priya to question them. A police officer comes to the station and notices him, surprisingly salutes him. Sudeep is Ajay Kumar Sarnayak. Ajay Kumar regains his memory.

Ajay Kumar Sarnayak, an honest ACP, fights crime. He arrests Basappa Ullagaddi and his companions for smuggling and extortion. Ajay's sister marries Ullagaddi's son. One day they poisoned him and killed his sister. He is saved by Major Chandrakant.

Ajay, regaining his memory, returns to his home and, acting as forgotten, plots revenge on Basappa Ullagaddi. On his mother's request, he takes his sister's baby. Ajay plots a kidnapping drama and kills Basappa Ullagaddi and his all companions.

Cast 

Sudeep as ACP Ajay Kumar Sarnayak, Assistant Commissioner of Police 
Rakshita as Priya
Ananthavelu as Major Chandrakanth (Priya's father)
Srinivas Prabhu as Dr. Ramakrishna
Swasthik Shankar 
Saadhu Kokila 
Bullet Prakash 
Thimme Gowda 
Chetan
Dharma
Shankar Gowda
Tennis Krishna 
Vijaya Sarathi 
Mandeep Roy
Vaijanath Biradar
Tharakesh Patel 
Shobhraj 
Dharanendrayya 
Lohithaswa
Lakshman Rao 
Badri Narayan 
Killer Venkatesh 
G. K. Govinda Rao 
Shankar Bhat 
Mallesh Gowda 
Rajashekhar Kotian 
Amarnath Aaradhya 
M. N. Lakshmi Devi
Shailaja Joshi
Chithra Shenoy 
Megha Bhagavatar 
Padmini 
Hubli Manjula 
Sangeetha Shetty

Soundtrack

Reception
One critic wrote that "'Hubballi' has elements of Hollywood hit 'The Bourne Identity'". RG Vijayasarathy of Rediff.com scored the film at 2.5 out of 5 stars and says "Hubballi is enjoyable only for Sudeep's performance and Rakshitha's comedy timing, but it requires a lot of patience to sit through the lengthy stunts and melodrama in the second half."

References

External links 
 

2006 films
2000s Kannada-language films
Indian action thriller films
Films directed by Om Prakash Rao
2006 action thriller films